This is a list of diplomatic missions of Laos. After gaining independence in 1950 the secluded landlocked country of Laos began establishing diplomatic relations with other countries in the world.  It still maintains ties with traditionally Eastern bloc countries, but Laos is now more concerned with developing more practical relationships with its Asian neighbours.

Americas

Asia

Europe

Oceania

Multilateral organisations

Gallery

Concurrent accreditation of Lao embassies on a non-resident basis (Unverified)

The Embassy in Beijing, China, has concurrent accreditation to the following: 

The Embassy in New Delhi, India, has concurrent accreditation to the following: 

 

The Embassy in Kuwait City, Kuwait has concurrent accreditation to the following:  

The Permanent Mission to the United Nations in Geneva, Switzerland, has concurrent accreditation to the following:  

The Embassy in Paris, France, has concurrent accreditation to the following:  

 

The Embassy in Vienna, Austria, has concurrent accreditation to the following: 

The Embassy in Havana, Cuba, has concurrent accreditation to the following: 

The Embassy in Washington, D.C., United States, has concurrent accreditation to the following: 

The Embassy in Canberra, Australia, has concurrent accreditation to the following:

See also
Foreign relations of Laos
Visa policy of Laos

Notes

References

 Ministry of Foreign Affairs of the Lao People's Democratic Republic (Page is broken, but information can be found in page source.)

 
Diplomatic missions
Laos